Rugiluclivina julieni is a species of ground beetle in the family Carabidae, found in Southeast Asia.

References

Scaritinae
Beetles described in 1896